Murali Krishna may refer to:

 Murali Krishna (film), a 1964 Telugu drama film
 Murali Krishna (director), Indian film director